Charles William Terry MacGill (16 June 1916 – 31 October 1999) was an Australian cricketer. He played six first-class cricket matches for Western Australia between 1939 and 1951. MacGill also served with the Royal Australian Air Force during World War II. His son, Terry MacGill, and grandson, Stuart MacGill, both played first-class cricket for Western Australia, with Stuart also playing 44 Tests for Australia.

References

External links

1916 births
1999 deaths
Australian cricketers
Military personnel from Western Australia
Royal Australian Air Force personnel of World War II
Western Australia cricketers
Cricketers from Perth, Western Australia